Kim Sarrazin (born September 17, 1977) is a Canadian softball designated player. 

Born  in Saint-Eustache, Quebec, Sarrazin began playing softball at age five, and is a graduate of Eastern Kentucky University. She was a part of the Canadian Softball team who finished ninth at the 2002 World Championships in Saskatoon, Saskatchewan and part of the Canadian Softball team who finished fifth at the 2004 Summer Olympics.

References

1977 births
Canadian softball players
Eastern Kentucky Colonels softball players
Living people
Olympic softball players of Canada
People from Saint-Eustache, Quebec
Sportspeople from Quebec
Softball players at the 2004 Summer Olympics